David Arroyo Durán (born 7 January 1980) is a Spanish cyclist, who currently competes in mountain biking for the Primaflor–Mondraker–XSauce team.

Career
Arroyo was born in Talavera de la Reina, Province of Toledo.

Illes Balears–Banesto, later Movistar Team (2005–2012)
After Valverde crashed in the first week of the 2006 Tour de France, Arroyo was made team leader, until Óscar Pereiro claimed the leader's yellow jersey. Arroyo then helped to protect Pereiro in the mountain climbs and ensure his overall victory.

Arroyo's biggest win to that point was Stage 19 of the 2008 Vuelta a España. Prior to that, his only victories came at the 2004 Volta a Portugal, where he won two stages, the mountains classification and the young rider classification.

In the 2010 Giro d'Italia, Arroyo wore the pink jersey as race leader for five days. He was part of a fortunate breakaway in stage 11 of that race that took over 13 minutes from the race's overall favourites, and claimed the jersey three days later on a mountain stage. He kept it through two mountain stages and the climbing time trial to Kronplatz, but lost it to eventual Giro champion Ivan Basso in stage 19. He finished the race second overall, in the process proving himself to be one of the best descenders in the peloton.

Major results

2000
 1st  Road race, National Under-23 Road Championships
2003
 1st Stage 1 (TTT) Volta a Catalunya
2004
 2nd Overall Volta a Portugal
1st  Mountains classification
1st  Young rider classification
1st Stages 4 & 8
 5th Subida al Naranco
 8th Overall Vuelta a Asturias
 10th Overall Vuelta a Castilla y León
2006
 5th Klasika Primavera
 9th Clásica a los Puertos de Guadarrama
 10th Overall Volta a Catalunya
2007
 10th Overall Giro d'Italia
2008
 1st Subida a Urkiola
 1st Stage 19 Vuelta a España
2009
 2nd Overall Tour du Limousin
1st Stage 3
 4th Subida a Urkiola
 5th Vuelta a La Rioja
 6th Subida al Naranco
 8th Overall Giro d'Italia
2010
 2nd Overall Giro d'Italia
Held  after Stages 14–18
 5th Vuelta a La Rioja
2011
 1st Stage 3 (TTT) Vuelta a Burgos
2013
 2nd Overall Vuelta a Burgos
 3rd Prueba Villafranca de Ordizia
2014
 8th Overall Route du Sud
 8th Vuelta a Murcia
 9th GP Miguel Induráin
 10th Overall Vuelta a Castilla y León
 10th Overall Vuelta a Burgos
2015
 9th Overall Vuelta a la Comunidad de Madrid
2016
 2nd Overall Tour of Turkey
 4th Overall Vuelta a Castilla y León
 8th Overall Vuelta a la Comunidad de Madrid
2017
 5th Overall Route du Sud

Grand Tour general classification results timeline

References

External links

Spanish male cyclists
1980 births
Living people
Spanish Vuelta a España stage winners
People from Talavera de la Reina
Sportspeople from the Province of Toledo
Cyclists from Castilla-La Mancha